The Malaya Belaya is a small river on the Kola Peninsula in Murmansk Oblast, Russia.

Geography
The river originates in the Khibiny Mountains and flows within a deep valley at the foot of the Yudychvumchorr. Its mouth is in Lake Imandra.

References

Rivers of Murmansk Oblast